Turraea is a genus of plants in the family Meliaceae, native throughout of Old World Tropics. In the countries of Angola, Australia ( Queensland, New South Wales), Benin, Botswana, Burundi, Cambodia, Cameroon, Central African Republic, China (southeast, Hainan), Comoros, Congo, Equatorial Guinea, Eritrea, Eswatini, Ethiopia, Gabon, Ghana, Gulf of Guinea Islands, Indonesia (Java, Lesser Sunda Islands, Western New Guinea) Ivory Coast, Kenya, Laos, Liberia, Madagascar, Malawi, Mauritius, Mozambique, Namibia (Caprivi Strip), Nigeria, Papua New Guinea, Philippines, Rwanda, Réunion, Saudi Arabia, Sierra Leone, Somalia, South Africa ( Cape Provinces, KwaZulu-Natal and Northern Provinces), Sudan, Tanzania, Thailand, Togo, Uganda, Vietnam, Yemen, Zambia and Zimbabwe.

Systematics 
The genus contains approximately 70 species, including:
 Turraea abyssinica Hochst.
 Turraea adjanohounii Aké Assi
 Turraea anomala (O. Hoffm.) Harms
 Turraea floribunda Hochst.
 Turraea fockei Buchenau
 Turraea geayi Danguy
 Turraea humberti Danguy
 Turraea kimbozensis Cheek
 Turraea laciniosa (Balf.f.) Harms
 Turraea lanceolata Cav.
 Turraea longifolia C. DC.
 Turraea mombassana
 Turraea nilotica Kotschy & Peyr.
 Turraea obovata Gürke
 Turraea obtusifolia Hochst.
 Turraea pervillei Baill.
 Turraea pubescens Hell.
 Turraea rhombifolia Baker
 Turraea richardii Baill.
 Turraea robusta
 Turraea rostrata C. DC.
 Turraea sericea Sm.
 Turraea socotrana White
 Turraea thouvenotii Danguy
 Turraea venulosa Baker
 Turraea villosa Bennett
 Turraea virens L.
 Turraea wakefieldii Oliv.
 Turraea zambesica Sprague & Hutch. ex Hutch.

Notes

References

External links

 
Meliaceae genera
Taxonomy articles created by Polbot